The haj, more commonly spelled hajj, is an annual Islamic pilgrimage to Mecca.

Haj may also refer to:

Places
Háj (Fichtel Mountains), a mountain in the Czech Republic
Háj (observation tower), an observation tower near Šumperk in the Czech Republic
Háj, Košice-okolie District, a municipality and village in Slovakia
Háj, Turčianske Teplice District, a municipality and village in Slovakia
Hāj, other name of Hajj Qeshlaq, a village in Iran

People 
 Haj Ross (born 1938), American linguist
 Joseph Haj, American artistic director

Other uses 
 The Haj, a novel by Leon Uris
 Hajong language, spoken in India and Bangladesh
 HAJ, IATA code for Hannover Airport, in Germany

See also 
 Hajj (disambiguation)